Raymund Tonog (born May 9, 2017) is a Filipino football player who has represented the Philippines internationally.

He played in the center back position.

Career

Club
Tonog played for Philippine Air Force F.C.

International
Tonog has played for the Philippines in the 1998 FIFA World Cup qualifiers in 1996 debuting in the 0-2 loss against India in the Asian preliminary round. He joined the national team again in 2001 in the 2002 FIFA World Cup qualification qualifiers

Tonog has also played for the national team in the AFF Championship participating in the 1998, 2000, and 2004.

References

1971 births
Living people
Filipino footballers
Philippines international footballers
Philippine Air Force F.C. players
Association football defenders